Anthea Elizabeth Joy McIntyre,  (born 29 June 1954) is a British Conservative Party politician who served as a Member of the European Parliament for the West Midlands from 2011 to 2020.

Career
Born in London, the daughter of David Scott McIntyre and Joy Irma Stratford McIntyre, she was educated at the independent Claremont School, Esher, and Queen's College, London. As a business woman in Ross-on-Wye, she has been a partner in the Wythall Estate since 1976; in 1985 she became a consultant with MCP Management Consultants, then was a partner in the company from 1991 to 2011.

McIntyre stood unsuccessfully for parliament as a Conservative for Redditch in the 1997 general election and for Shrewsbury and Atcham in the 2001 general election. She was also unsuccessful as a Conservative candidate in the 2009 European election for the West Midlands constituency, but in December 2011 she was appointed to serve as a member for that constituency in the European Parliament without a new election. This was because the Lisbon Treaty had enlarged the European Parliament by eighteen, and one of these new seats came to the United Kingdom. Britain decided to allocate this to the West Midlands regional constituency, on the basis of population statistics. The results of the 2009 European elections were then considered to decide who would have won the additional seat if it had existed then. The result of this was that it was awarded to McIntyre.

She served on the European Parliament's Committee on Employment and Social Affairs and as a member of the Delegation for Relations with South Africa.

McIntyre was appointed Commander of the Order of the British Empire (CBE) in the 2022 New Year Honours for political and public service.

Personal life
In 1999 McIntyre married Frank Myers, MBE. She lives in Walford, Ross-on-Wye.

Notes

References

1954 births
Living people
People educated at Claremont Fan Court School
People educated at Queen's College, London
Conservative Party (UK) MEPs
People from Ross-on-Wye
MEPs for England 2009–2014
MEPs for England 2014–2019
MEPs for England 2019–2020
21st-century women MEPs for England
Conservative Party (UK) parliamentary candidates
Commanders of the Order of the British Empire